Papigoe  is a village on the east coast of Caithness, at the head of Broad Haven Bay in the Scottish Highlands and is in the Scottish council area of Highland.

Populated places in Caithness